Maciste in the Lion's Cage (Italian:Maciste nella gabbia dei leoni) is a 1926 Italian silent adventure film directed by Guido Brignone and starring Bartolomeo Pagano, Elena Sangro and Luigi Serventi. It was part of the popular Maciste series of films. It was the penultimate film of the silent series, followed by The Giant of the Dolomites (1927)

Synopsis
Maciste is sent to Africa by a circus showman to capture some lions.

Cast 
 Bartolomeo Pagano as Maciste 
 Elena Sangro as Sarah, la cavallerizza 
 Luigi Serventi as Strasser 
 Mimi Dovia as Seida 
 Umberto Guarracino as Sullivan 
 Oreste Grandi as Karl Pommer
 Alberto Collo as Giorgio Pommer 
 Giuseppe Brignone as Bob, il vecchio clown 
 Andrea Habay
 Vittorio Bianchi 
 Augusto Bandini 
 Franz Sala

References

Bibliography 
 Brunetta, Gian Piero. The History of Italian Cinema: A Guide to Italian Film from Its Origins to the Twenty-first Century. Princeton University Press, 2009. 
 Moliterno, Gino. Historical Dictionary of Italian Cinema. Scarecrow Press, 2008.
 Ricci, Steven. Cinema and Fascism: Italian Film and Society, 1922–1943. University of California Press, 2008.

External links 
 

1926 films
Italian adventure films
Italian silent feature films
1920s Italian-language films
Films directed by Guido Brignone
1926 adventure films
Films set in Africa
Circus films
Maciste films
Italian black-and-white films
Silent adventure films
1920s Italian films